Nicolas Gétaz (born 11 June 1991) is a Swiss professional footballer who plays for Yverdon-Sport.

Club career
On 20 July 2021, he returned to Yverdon-Sport, 11 years after his first stint with the club.

References

External links
 Career history at ASF
 
 

1991 births
People from Morges
Living people
Swiss men's footballers
Association football defenders
FC Lausanne-Sport players
Yverdon-Sport FC players
FC Stade Nyonnais players
FC Vaduz players
Swiss Challenge League players
Swiss Super League players
Swiss expatriate footballers
Expatriate footballers in Liechtenstein
Swiss expatriate sportspeople in Liechtenstein
Sportspeople from the canton of Vaud